is Japanese singer-songwriter Ua's third re-cut single and tenth overall, released on May 21, 1998. "Yuganda Taiyō" was produced by Johnny Fingers, while the B-side "Koibito" was produced by Lenny Kaye. The single debuted at #77, spending only one week on the Oricon singles chart.

Track listing

CD

Vinyl

Charts and sales

References

External links
 SPEEDSTAR RECORDS | UA 「歪んだ太陽」

1998 singles
Ua (singer) songs
Songs written by Johnnie Fingers
1998 songs